The personal name Duncan can be found in Scotland’s oldest records in its Gaelic form Dunchad/Donchadh/Donachie/Donnchadh and other spelling variants.

Origins
(Dunchad)  Duncan, originally a forename is one of the earliest names in Scotland – and originates from the Dalriadan Celtic Celtic Scotii (Scots) from Ireland who colonised the south west of Scotland from about the 4th century AD. Dúnchad (Duncan mac Conaing) co-ruled Dalriada with Conall II (c.650 - 654).

Other early accounts of the name include the  inscribed ‘4th century AD Turpillian Stone’ located at Crickhowell, Wales. A particularly early mention of the name Duncan. Inscribed in Ogham (an early form of Celtic writing) on the stone also carried the Latin translation "TURPILLI IC IACIT PUUERI TRILUNI DUNOCATI" which roughly translates as 'The Fort Warrior'. Mention is also made of Dunchad (Duncan) the 11th Abbot of Iona, 707 – 717AD (later St. Dunchadh) and Dunchad (Duncan) the 39th Abbot in 989AD.

Records from this time are scant and it is not until after the unification by Kenneth MacAlpin around 843 AD of the Celtic Scots of Dál Riata (Dalriada) and the aboriginal Picts of northern Britain do we start to see the name significantly being used in other parts of Scotland. One of the earliest references to Dunchad/Donchad, is found in the margins of the 11th century Book of Deer the oldest writings in Scots Gaelic known in Scotland today, These manuscript were written by the early Christian Monks of the Abbey of Deer in Aberdeenshire.
  
When Duncan I took the Scottish throne, unlike the "King Duncan" of Shakespeare's Macbeth, the historical Duncan appears to have been a young man. He followed his grandfather Malcolm II as king after the latter's death on 25 Nov. 1034, without apparent opposition. He may have been Malcolm's acknowledged successor or tánaise as the succession appears to have been uneventful. Duncan would have been wise to pacify his remaining family, especially his cousin Thorfinn the Mighty, Earl of Orkney; his other cousin, Macbeth; and the person closest to his throne, Queen Gruoch, Macbeth's wife. By 1040, however, Duncan had been defeated in battle and the crown was in the hands Macbeth.

Fifty-four years later, despite being the son of Malcolm Canmore, Duncan II was also dead at the hands of his relatives. Although Duncan had left a son, the throne was seized by his younger half-brother, one of the children of English Queen Margaret.

Ewyn (Ewan) fitz Duncan  was one of the signatories on ‘The Ragman Rolls’, the deed of homage draughted by Edward I of England to bind the King and nobles of Scotland.

John Duncan was the owner of property in Berwick in 1367. The mayor of this Border port is recorded as John Duncanson, in all likelihood the formers son.

According to one account, a Clan Donachie/Donnachadh had emerged in the early 14th century from the Earls of Athole. The clan name is said to come from Donnachadh Reamhar -‘Stout Duncan’. Legend has it that this chief led the clan into Battle at Bannockburn in 1314. Both the Duncans and the Clan Donnachaidh (Robertsons) descend from the 4th Donachie/Donnachadh Chief.

The predominant Duncans of the East of Scotland were the Duncans of Lundie in Forfarshire. Their extensive property included not only the Barony of Lundie but also the estate of Gourdie. In 1764, George III’s physician, Sir William Duncan was created a Baronet. The 1st and last Baronet. By 1795, Adam Duncan of Lundie had become Commander of the Fleet in the North Sea and Admiral of the Blue. With a glorious career of victories he was created 1st Viscount Duncan of Camperdown in 1797 and his son was made the 2nd Earl of Camperdown in 1831. The title became extinct in 1933 with the death of George Alexander Philips Haldane Haldane-Duncan, 4th Earl of Camperdown (1845–1933) in Boston, Massachusetts. The Duncan name in Scotland is most prominent in Aberdeenshire, Dundee & Angus, and Fife.

Castles

Lundie Castle, once stood seven miles south-east of Coupar Angus, but there are no remains. The lands were held by the Duncans and many of them are buried in nearby Lundie kirkyard. The castle was demolished and replaced by a house in the seventeenth century, which itself was demolished to make way for the present mansion.
Camperdown House was built by the Duncans in the nineteenth century in four hundred acres of park land. The grounds are now a country park. As of 2008 there were plans to have a museum at Camperdown House about Adam Duncan, 1st Viscount Duncan and his victory at the Battle of Camperdown.

Branches

'Duncan Territorial Houses, Lairds and Barons'

Duncan of Seaside & Lundie (Camperdown)
Duncan of Jordanstone
Duncan of Ardownie
Duncan of Sketraw
Duncan of Mott
Duncan of Parkhill
Beveridge-Duncan of Damside
Gomme-Duncan of Dunbarney

Clan Position

Clan Duncan is an Armigerous clan but with no present Chief of the name Duncan. For the present, the Clan is being led by the armigerous Territorial House of Duncan of Sketraw. Both Armorial Bearings and Territorial Designation are recorded in the Public Register of All Arms and Bearings in Scotland. It is the aim of the Clan Duncan Society to have a Chief of the name Duncan or one of the various spelling variants officially recognised by the Lord Lyon King of Arms either by a proven genealogical link to the last Chief around 1434 or more likely by the Derbfine process laid down by The Lord Lyon to gain official recognition of a Clan Duncan Chief.

Clan Tartans

 Tartans associated with Clan Duncan

The ancient kilt - not displayed 
Duncan or Leslie of Wardis Clan/Family Tartan which is the oldest and dates from around 1880. Little is known why the tartan is co named Leslie of Wardis an Aberdeenshire Family however, it has always been associated and known as the Clan Duncan Tartan.

Thread Count:

K/8 G42 W6 G42 B42 R/8

(Half Sett with Full Count at the Pivots.)

The Duncan of Sketraw Clan/Family Tartan, designed in 2005 by Brian Wilton of Scottish Tartans Authority.

Thread Count:

R/4 K12 G4 K4 G28 K2 Y4 K2 B10 R2 B10 
K2 W4 K2 G28 K2 B/4

(Half Sett with Full Count at the Pivots.)

See also
Duncan (surname)
Clan Donnachaidh

References

External links
Clan Duncan Society

Duncan
Armigerous clans